Morweh District is a district of Rivercess County, Liberia. It was one of the county's two original districts.

References

 

Districts of Liberia
Rivercess County